Dove Holes railway station serves the village of Dove Holes, Derbyshire, England. It is managed and served by Northern Trains.

History

It was opened in 1863 by the LNWR, at the summit of its line between Whaley Bridge and Buxton.

Originally, the Midland Railway had hoped that the LNWR would join it in extending the line that they jointly leased between Ambergate and Rowsley. The LNWR declined, then built this one from Buxton to meet its line to Manchester.

Later, the Midland built a line from Millers Dale, via Chapel, to Chinley, passing 183 feet beneath it in Dove Holes Tunnel.

Facilities
The station is unmanned and has no ticket facilities, so all tickets must be bought on the train or prior to travel. There are no permanent buildings other than waiting shelters on each platform; train running details are provided by telephone and timetable poster boards. Step-free access is available to both platforms via ramps.

Accident 
In 1957, the steep gradient north of here down towards Chapel-en-le-Frith was the scene of a serious accident, in which the driver of a runaway freight train, John Axon, remained at his post and died when it ran into the back of a preceding train. Axon was awarded a posthumous George Cross for his actions.

Service 
There are services every two hours Monday-Saturday towards Manchester Piccadilly northbound and Buxton southbound (other trains pass through without calling); some extra calls are provided at peak times.

On Sundays, the service frequency in both directions from the station is also two-hourly.

See also 
 Peak Forest Tramway

References

External links 

  for Dove Holes railway station

Railway stations in Derbyshire
DfT Category F2 stations
Former London and North Western Railway stations
Railway stations in Great Britain opened in 1863
Northern franchise railway stations
1863 establishments in England
Chapel-en-le-Frith